Ratnadvipia irradians is a species of air-breathing land snail, a terrestrial pulmonate gastropod mollusk in the family Ariophantidae. It is endemic to island of Sri Lanka.

Description
Shell is thin and solid, color ranging from bright golden brown to greenish yellow. Apex obtuse. Lunate oval aperture is large, and very oblique. Foot pale.

Ecology
It is the most widespread of Sri Lanka's endemic land snails, which can be found in dry zone and intermediate forests and home gardens.

References

External links
Photos of Ratnadvipia irradians

Ariophantidae
Gastropods described in 1852